This is a list of chapters for the manga series Major written and illustrated by Takuya Mitsuda. The manga started in the 1994 issue #33 of Weekly Shōnen Sunday on August 3, 1994. The series finished with its 747th chapter in the 2010 issue #32 of Weekly Shōnen Sunday published on July 7, 2010. Seventy-eight tankōbon volumes were published by Shogakukan. An anime adaptation based on the manga was produced by Studio Hibari and aired on NHK.

A sequel, titled Major 2nd, began in Weekly Shōnen Sunday on March 11, 2015.



Volume list

Volumes 1–20

Volumes 21–40

Volumes 41–60

Volumes 61–78

References